I Hate Mondays is a 1971 Polish comedy film directed by Tadeusz Chmielewski.

Plot 
The action of the film takes place on an unlucky Monday in Warsaw and focuses on episodes from the lives of a dozen or so characters. Italian industrialist Francesco Rovanelli (Kazimierz Witkiewicz), who comes to Warsaw with the intention of signing a lucrative contract, unexpectedly gets lost in a foreign city. A militia officer (Andrzej Herder) in charge of the movement has to take care of his little son, who, like other children, has not been admitted to the kindergarten because of the rubella plague that prevails there, and his wife (Joanna Kasperska), who works in a matrimonial office, cannot leave her job. The delegate of the commune cooperative (Jerzy Turek) is looking for a spare part for a combine harvester and argues with the impetuous taxi driver (Adam Mularczyk), and the drunk actor Bohdan Łazuka (appearing as himself) tries to get home, walking through the awakening Warsaw led by tram tracks, in which he stuck the crank to the car.

Cast 

 Kazimierz Witkiewicz – Francesco Rovanelli
 Jerzy Turek – Zygmunt Bączyk
 Zygmunt Apostoł – Artist
 Kazimierz Rudzki – Director
 Adam Mularczyk – Taxi Driver
 Bogusz Bilewski – Driver
 Andrzej Gawroński – Wladek
 Mieczysław Czechowicz – Thief
 Andrzej Herder – Cop
 Halina Kowalska – Marianna

References

External links 

1971 comedy films
1971 films
Polish comedy films
1970s Polish-language films